Čestice is a municipality and village in Rychnov nad Kněžnou District in the Hradec Králové Region of the Czech Republic. It has about 600 inhabitants.

Administrative parts
The village of Častolovické Horky is an administrative part of Čestice.

References

Villages in Rychnov nad Kněžnou District